Proteuxoa cyanoloma is a moth of the family Noctuidae. It is found in New South Wales, Tasmania and Victoria.

External links
Australian Faunal Directory

Proteuxoa
Moths of Australia
Moths described in 1902
Taxa named by Oswald Bertram Lower